Ride to Freedom is a 1937 German historical war film directed by Karl Hartl and starring Willy Birgel, Viktor Staal and Hansi Knoteck. The film is set in the 1830s during Poland's November Uprising against the Russian Empire. It portrays the rehabilitation of a Polish cavalry officer whose initial reluctance to engage the enemy leads to the death of his comrades, but later dies fighting bravely.

The film was made by German's leading studio UFA, with interiors shot at the Babelsberg Studios. UFA received co-operation from the Polish War Ministry who supplied 5th Regiment of Zaslaw Uhlans for the filming of battles scenes that took place around Ostroleka in Poland. The Polish ambassador to Germany Józef Lipski attended the film's premiere at the Palast-am-Zoo in Berlin on 14 January 1937. Around the same time Germany and Poland, future enemies in the Second World War, co-produced two films together Augustus the Strong and Adventure in Warsaw.

Cast
 Willy Birgel as Julek Staniewski
 Viktor Staal as Jan Wolski
 Hansi Knoteck as Janka Koslowska
 Ursula Grabley as Katerina Tschernikoff
 Heinz von Cleve as Saganoff
 Berthold Ebbecke as Malinowski
 Werner Schott as Bobrikoff
 Edwin Jürgensen as Fürst Tschernikoff
 Hermann Braun as Milewski - polnischer Fähnrich
 Hans Reinhard Knitsch as Smirnoff - russischer Fähnrich
 Rudolf Schündler as Polnischer Student
 Aribert Grimmer as Polnischer Wachtmeister
 Clemens Hasse as Betrunkener Fährmann
 Peter Elsholtz as Adjutant des Gouverneurs
 Horst Birr as Krupka
 Charlie Kracker as Hässlicher Ulan
 Lidija Daurdina as Gouvernante
 Werner Bernhardy as Major
 Curt Cappi as Diener des Rittmeisters Staniewski
 Hermann Hardy as Erzieher des Prinzen
 Gustav Mahncke as Unparteiischer beim Duell
 Dagmar Muthardt as Junges Mädchen beim Ball
 Siegmar Schneider as Großfürst
 Louise von Krogh as Begleiterin des Gouverneurs beim Ball
 Michael von Newlinsky as Russischer Offizier beim Ball
 Kurt Daehn

References

Bibliography

External links 
 

1937 films
Films of Nazi Germany
German war films
German historical films
1930s historical films
1937 war films
1930s German-language films
Films directed by Karl Hartl
Films set in the 1830s
Films set in Poland
Films shot in Poland
German black-and-white films
Films shot at Babelsberg Studios
UFA GmbH films
1930s German films